Willy van Zwieteren (15 January 1904 – 26 November 1983) was a Dutch footballer. He played in one match for the Netherlands national football team in 1929.

References

External links
 

1904 births
1983 deaths
Dutch footballers
Netherlands international footballers
Place of birth missing
Association footballers not categorized by position